Rhydwyn (Rhyd-Wyn) is a village in the community of Cylch-y-Garn, in the north west of Anglesey, Wales. Rhydwyn is named after a little stream crossing the centre of the village; "Rhyd" means ford and "Wyn" White. 

Rhydwyn was also home to the infamous unicyclist Red Fred who died 23-2-82. He is buried down the road at Llanrhuddlad Church, Church Bay.

References

External links

Villages in Anglesey
Cylch-y-Garn